Phi is the second studio album by Swedish rock band Truckfighters, released 5 October 2007 on Fuzzorama Records.

Track listing
All tracks written by Truckfighters.

Personnel

Truckfighters
 Ozo - bass, vocals
 Fredo - guitar
 Dango - guitar
 Paco - drums

Additional musicians
 Kersti Manell - cello
 Andreas Strömbäck - organ
 Stefan Koglek - guitar solo (track 4)
 Oscar Johansson - congas (track 9)
 Martin Augustini - backing vocals (track 9)

References

2007 albums
Truckfighters albums